Argentinien-schwizertütsch is a dialect of Swiss German. Argentinien-schwizertütsch is spoken by persons of Swiss origin. Most speakers live in Argentina, being the descendants of 19th-century immigrants from Switzerland.

See also 
Swiss Argentine

References

External links 
 PDF on varieties of German (5=INDO-EUROPEAN phylosector; 1999)

Swiss German language
German dialects
Languages of Argentina
German-Argentine culture
Swiss-Argentine culture